Grant McLaren (born 19 August 1948) is a Canadian long-distance runner. He competed in the 5000 metres at the 1972 Summer Olympics and the 1976 Summer Olympics.

References

1948 births
Living people
Athletes (track and field) at the 1970 British Commonwealth Games
Athletes (track and field) at the 1972 Summer Olympics
Athletes (track and field) at the 1976 Summer Olympics
Canadian male long-distance runners
Canadian male steeplechase runners
Olympic track and field athletes of Canada
Athletes (track and field) at the 1971 Pan American Games
Pan American Games track and field athletes for Canada
Place of birth missing (living people)
Commonwealth Games competitors for Canada